Dino George Fekaris (born January 24, 1945, Pittsburgh, Pennsylvania, United States) is a Greek-American music producer and songwriter.

Fekaris was the producer and co-writer (with Freddie Perren) of the song "I Will Survive", and other songs sung by Gloria Gaynor.
He has been nominated five times for the Grammy Award, winning once in 1979 for "I Will Survive".

Biography 
Dino attended Wayne State University in Detroit, Michigan, and was a member of Delta Chi Fraternity.

He joined Motown at the tail end of the 1960s as a producer and writer, initially linking with Nick Zesses and working with the likes of The Naturals. Their first major success came with Rare Earth, for whom they penned "I Just Want to Celebrate" and "Hey Big Brother", with Zesses and Fekaris also linking up with fellow writer and producer Tom Baird in the band Matrix. The trio also wrote together, penning "Love Me" for Diana Ross, a No. 38 UK hit in 1974.
 
Fekaris was fired by Motown in the mid-70s, and he teamed up with Perren to write "I Will Survive", later recorded by Gloria Gaynor. Felaris and Perren also wrote a number of songs together, including "Shake Your Groove Thing", "I Pledge My Love" and "Reunited" by Peaches & Herb, "She Don't Let Nobody (But Me)" by Curtis Mayfield, and "Makin' It" by David Naughton.

References

1945 births
Living people
Record producers from Pennsylvania
Songwriters from Pennsylvania
American people of Greek descent
Wayne State University alumni
Grammy Award winners